Bledar Mançaku (born 5 January 1982) is an Albanian retired footballer who played as a forward.

He has previously played for Teuta Durrës, Shkumbini Peqin and Besa Kavajë at club level and the Albanian under-21 and senior sides internationally.

Club career
On 9 June 2010, Mançaku joined Shkumbini Peqin by penning a two-year contract. The transfer was made official one day later.

On 5 January 2014, Mancaku was sent on loan to fellow Albanian Superliga side Besa Kavajë until the end of 2013–14 season.

After two years as free agent, Mançaku announced his retirement on 9 September 2017.

International career
He made his debut for Albania in a March 2002 friendly match against Mexico in San Diego and earned a total of 2 caps, scoring no goals. His other international was a November 2003 friendly against Estonia.

National team statistics

References

External links

FSHF

1982 births
Living people
Footballers from Durrës
Albanian footballers
Association football forwards
Albania under-21 international footballers
Albania international footballers
Kategoria Superiore players
Kategoria e Parë players
KF Teuta Durrës players
Besa Kavajë players
KS Shkumbini Peqin players
KF Adriatiku Mamurrasi players